Seeding a material is a concept used in fluid dynamics to describe the act of introducing specific particulates or other foreign substances into a stream of fluid being evaluated. An altered fluid will be described as having a seeded flow.

Details

These particulates are generally small enough to be carried by the fluid but large enough to be picked up using a flow visualization technique, such as particle image velocimetry (PIV).  In reference to aerodynamic testing, such as wind tunnel testing, water tunnel testing, or any other test investigating the flow of a fluid which may be invisible to the naked eye, seeding a flow is often the only way to take visual measurements.  Simple examples of a seeded flow include the introduction of smoke into a low speed wind tunnel to see the general path of the air, or injecting colored dye into a water tunnel to see secondary flow structures such as hairpin vortices.

As stated in The Handbook of Fluid Dynamics, an ideal seeding particle should have uniform properties such that its density is the same as the fluid that it's added to.

See also

 Flow visualization
 Fluid dynamics
 Fluid mechanics
 Streamlines, streaklines, and pathlines

References

Fluid dynamics